Fedor Tarasovich Gusev (Russian: Фёдор Тарасович Гусев) (29 April 1905 – 9 March 1987 in Moscow) was a Soviet diplomat.

Career
Gusev graduated in 1931 from Law Institute in Leningrad and in 1937 from Diplomatic Institute. Since 1935 he worked for the Soviet Ministry of Foreign Affairs:
 1938–39: head of the 3rd Western Department
 1941: in the 2nd European Department
 1942–43: ambassador in Canada
 1943–46: ambassador in Great Britain
 1946–52: Deputy Minister of Foreign Affairs of the Soviet Union
 1956–62: ambassador in Sweden
 later worked in the central apparatus of the USSR Ministry of Foreign Affairs, until 1975.

Gusev took part in the Tehran, Yalta and Potsdam Conferences as well as the European Advisory Commission. Between 1946–50, he was also member of the Supreme Soviet of the USSR.

Death
Gusev died on 9 March 1987 in Moscow, and was buried at Kuntsevo Cemetery.

References

External links
 Short biography (in Russian)
 Soviet and Russian ambassadors in Great Britain (in Russian)

1905 births
1987 deaths
Second convocation members of the Soviet of the Union
Ambassadors of the Soviet Union to Canada
Ambassadors of the Soviet Union to the United Kingdom
Ambassadors of the Soviet Union to Sweden